There are 41 Urban councils in Sri Lanka, which are the legislative bodies that preside over the second tier municipalities in the country. Introduced in 1987 through the 13th Amendment to the Constitution of Sri Lanka, Urban councils became a devolved subject under the Provincial Councils in the Local Government system of Sri Lanka. The Urban councils collectively govern approximately 1,388,000 people. There are 417 Councillors in total, ranging from 22 to 7 per council.

Urban councils

Current

Former
Elevated to Municipal council status in 1959
 Dehiwala-Mount Lavinia Urban Council
Elevated to Municipal council status in 1997
 Moratuwa Urban Council
 Sri Jayawardenapura Kotte Urban Council
Elevated to Municipal council status in 2011
 Bandarawela Urban Council
 Hambantota Urban Council

See also
List of cities in Sri Lanka
Provincial government in Sri Lanka
Local government in Sri Lanka
Municipal councils of Sri Lanka
Pradeshiya Sabha

Notes
Parties

References

 
Populated places in Sri Lanka
Sri Lanka, List of cities in
Municipalities